Fanny Ben-Ami (née Fanny Eyal; born 19 March 1930) is a French writer and child of the Holocaust.

Biography
Fanny Ben-Ami was born in 1930 in Baden-Baden, Germany, to Hirsch and Yohanna-Hannah Eyal, but her parents fled to Paris in 1933. 

After her father was arrested by the French secret police she and her two sisters were sent away by their mother to be sheltered by the O.S.E. (Œuvre de secours aux enfants, "Children's Aid Society")". She was housed for nearly three years in a children's home in the Creuse region of Vichy France at the Château de Chaumont in the commune of La Serre-Bussière-Vieille. 

Following their betrayal to the Gestapo, the children had to flee to other refuges across Vichy France. At the age of 13, without accompanying adults, she managed to lead a group of other Jewish children from France to neutral Switzerland, escaping from the Wehrmacht and the Nazi persecution of the Holocaust.

After the war she moved to a kibbutz in Israel and met her musician husband, later becoming a painter.

Memoir
In 2011 her memoir Le journal de Fanny was published in France, in which she recounts the escape.

The 2016 French-Belgian film Le Voyage de Fanny (Fanny's Journey) directed by Lola Doillon, was based on the book.

A revised edition of the book was published as a film tie-in in 2016 with the title Le Voyage de Fanny.

References

Further reading
 

1930 births
French memoirists
People from Paris
French Jews
The Holocaust in France
Writers on antisemitism